Kakrala Kalan is a village in the Ludhiana district in Punjab, India. The total population of the village is about 4,165.

References

  
Villages in Ludhiana district